Lawrence Neville Brand (August 13, 1920 – April 16, 1992) was an American soldier and actor. He was known for playing villainous or antagonistic character roles in Westerns, crime dramas, and films noir, and was nominated for a BAFTA Award for his performance in Riot in Cell Block 11 (1954). 

During World War II, Brand served in the 331st Infantry Regiment of the 83rd Infantry Division in the U.S. Army, in the European theatre. He received multiple meritorious citations for his service, including the Silver Star and the Purple Heart.

Early life
 
Neville Brand was born in Griswold, Iowa, one of seven children of Leo Thomas Brand and the former Helen Louise Davis. His father had worked as an electrician and bridge-building ironworker in Detroit. Neville was raised in Kewanee, Illinois, where he attended high school. After his schooling he helped support the family, employed as a soda jerk, waiter, and shoe salesman in Kewanee.

War service 
Brand entered the Illinois Army National Guard on October 23, 1939, as a private in Company F, 129th Infantry Regiment. He was enlisted in the United States Army as Corporal Neville L. Brand, infantryman on March 5, 1941.

He trained at Fort Carson and served in World War II, seeing action with B company, 331st Infantry Regiment of the 83rd Infantry Division (Thunderbolt Division) in the Ardennes, Rhineland and Central European campaigns. Brand, a sergeant and platoon leader, was wounded in action along the Weser River on April 7, 1945. He was shot in the upper right arm and nearly bled to death.

Brand was awarded the Silver Star, the third-highest decoration for valor in the U.S. military, for gallantry in combat. His other awards and decorations were the Purple Heart, the Good Conduct Medal, the American Defense Service Medal, the European-African-Middle Eastern Campaign Medal with three Battle Stars, one Overseas Service Bar, one Service Stripe and the Combat Infantryman Badge. In a 1966 interview Brand explained the Silver Star, stating that withering fire from German machine guns in a hunting lodge kept him and his unit pinned down. "I must have flipped my lid," he said. "I decided to go into that lodge." He was discharged in October 1945.

Brand was sometimes cited in media reports as the 4th most-decorated American serviceman of the war, but this was incorrect and repeatedly denied by Brand himself.

Medals and ribbons

Acting career

Early roles
After his discharge, Brand worked on a 1946 Army Signal Corps film with Charlton Heston and next settled in Greenwich Village and enrolled at the American Theatre Wing, working off-Broadway, including Jean-Paul Sartre's The Victors. He also attended the Geller Drama School in Los Angeles on the G.I. Bill.

Brand had an uncredited bit in Battleground (1949) and Port of New York (1949). His first credited part was in D.O.A. (1950) as a henchman named Chester. His hulking physique, rough-hewn, craggy-faced looks and gravelly voice led to his largely playing gangsters, Western outlaws and various screen "heavies", cops and other tough-guy roles throughout his career.

Brand was uncredited in My Foolish Heart (1949), Where the Sidewalk Ends (1950) (both starring Dana Andrews), and curiously Kiss Tomorrow Goodbye where he plays a significant early role as James Cagney's fellow chain gang inmate, (1950) but had a good role on TV in The Bigelow Theatre.

Brand's parts slowly grew bigger: Halls of Montezuma (1951), Only the Valiant (1951), The Mob (1951), and Red Mountain (1951).

On TV he did a short, Benjy (1951), and episodes of The Unexpected and Your Favorite Story. He was in Kansas City Confidential (1952), The Turning Point (1952), and, notably, Stalag 17 (1953).

Brand was now much in demand as a support actor, appearing in The Charge at Feather River (1953), The Man from the Alamo (1953), and Gun Fury (1953).

Leading man
Brand moved up to leading roles with Man Crazy (1953) and then Riot in Cell Block 11 (1954). The latter role, as the leader of a prison uprising, earned him a BAFTA nomination for Best Foreign Actor at the 8th British Academy Film Awards, but he lost to Marlon Brando for On the Waterfront. Brand was down the cast list for The Lone Gun (1954) but had the lead in Return from the Sea (1954).

Brand had a supporting role in The Prodigal (1955) and The Return of Jack Slade and guest roles in Appointment with Adventure, Screen Directors Playhouse, Studio One in Hollywood, Jane Wyman Presents The Fireside Theatre, Chevron Hall of Stars, Schlitz Playhouse, General Electric Theater, The United States Steel Hour, and Stage 7.

He had lead roles in Bobby Ware Is Missing (1955) and Fury at Gunsight Pass (1956) and supported in Raw Edge (1956), and Mohawk (1956).

He had the distinction of being the first actor to portray outlaw Butch Cassidy, in the film The Three Outlaws opposite Alan Hale Jr. as the Sundance Kid. Though not the big-budget romp that the later Paul Newman–Robert Redford film was, both Brand's Cassidy and Hale's Kid were played as likable outlaws, a rare change from Brand's typecasting as a murderous psycho. He followed it with Gun Brothers (1956).

Brand became well known as a villain when he killed the character played by Elvis Presley in his debut film Love Me Tender (1956).  He was in The Way to the Gold (1957), The Lonely Man (1957), The Tin Star (1957), Cry Terror! (1958), and Badman's Country (1958).

He often had better roles on such TV shows as Climax!, Playhouse 90, Target and notably an adaptation of All the King's Men for Kraft Theatre, directed by Sidney Lumet, playing Willie Stark, for which he earned a Sylvania Award in 1958.

Brand was also a guest star on The Texan, Pursuit, Dick Powell's Zane Grey Theatre, and The Dupont Show of the Month (doing Body and Soul with Ben Gazzara).

Al Capone
Brand twice portrayed Al Capone on the television series The Untouchables, in the pilot and opening scene of the premiere "The Empty Chair" (although uncredited) and then in the double episode "The Big Train"; as well as often glimpses in flashback throughout the series.

Brand was in Five Gates to Hell (1959), The Adventures of Huckleberry Finn (1960), The Last Sunset (1961), and The George Raft Story (1961), reprising his role as Al Capone in the latter.

He guest-starred on Straightaway, Cain's Hundred, Death Valley Days, The Joey Bishop Show, Naked City, The DuPont Show of the Week, Ben Casey, Rawhide, The Lieutenant, Theatre of Stars, Arrest and Trial, Destry, Wagon Train, Suspense, Combat!, Gunsmoke, Bonanza and The Virginian.

He also portrayed a prison guard of Birdman of Alcatraz, was second billed in Hero's Island (1962) and had a key role in That Darn Cat! (1965).

Brand co-starred with George Takei in "The Encounter," a 1964 episode of the Twilight Zone, as a World War II veteran.  CBS considered the episode's theme of US-Japanese hatred "too disturbing" to include when the series was syndicated. "The Encounter" was not seen after its initial airing until it was released on video in 1992 as part of the Treasures of the Twilight Zone collection.

Laredo
Brand was given the star role in a TV series, Laredo (1965–67) which ran for 56 episodes.

Brand played a heartwarming character who was brain damaged and misunderstood in an episode of the television series Daniel Boone. He guest-starred on Tarzan.

He was in The Desperados (1969) and played U.S. Navy Lieutenant Kaminsky, ignored as he tried to warn his commander of the opening skirmish in Tora! Tora! Tora! (1970).

1970s
In the 1970s Brand could be seen in Westward the Wagon (1971), Lock, Stock and Barrel (1971), The Chicago Teddy Bears, Marriage: Year One, and The Smith Family. He played Hoss Cartwright's (Dan Blocker) Swedish uncle Gunnar Borgstrom on Bonanza in the episode "The Last Viking".

He was in Longstreet, Alias Smith and Jones, Adventures of Nick Carter, Marcus Welby, M.D., Two for the Money (1972), No Place to Run (1972), The Police Connection (1972), This Is a Hijack (1973), Cahill, U.S. Marshal (1973) with John Wayne, Scalawag (1973), The Magician, The Deadly Trackers (1973) with Richard Harris, Killdozer (1974), Death Stalk (1975), Police Story, Police Woman, Barbary Coast, Kojak, Mobile One, McCloud, Psychic Killer (1975), Island of Adventure, The Quest, and Captains and the Kings.

Brand was top billed in Eaten Alive (1976) directed by Tobe Hooper. He was in Fire! (1977), The Mouse and His Child (1977), Baretta, Captains Courageous, Man from Atlantis, Quincy M.E., The Seekers and Hi-Riders (1978). He had a key part in Five Days from Home (1978) directed by George Peppard, and in Angels' Brigade (1979).

1980s
In 1980, Brand appeared as Major Marvin Groper in The Ninth Configuration, written and directed by The Exorcist author William Peter Blatty.

His final roles included Fantasy Island, Without Warning (1980), Harper Valley P.T.A., and The Return (1982). He was top billed in his last film, Evils of the Night (1985).

Personal life
Brand and his wife, Rae, had three daughters. 

A Republican, he supported the campaign of Dwight Eisenhower during the 1952 presidential election.

Brand was an insatiable reader who amassed a collection of 30,000 books over the years, one of the largest private libraries in Los Angeles. Most of his collection were destroyed in a 1978 fire at his Malibu home. 

His wartime service caused him post-traumatic stress disorder that led to bouts of alcoholism. In 1975, he said in an interview that his addiction had cost him most of his fortune.

Death
Brand died from emphysema at Sutter General Hospital in Sacramento, California, on April 16, 1992, at age 71. After a private funeral service he was cremated, and his remains were interred in a niche of the Morning Glory Room at East Lawn Memorial Park in Sacramento.

Selected filmography

Film

 Port of New York (1949) as Ike – Stasser's Henchman (uncredited)
 My Foolish Heart (1949) as Football Game Spectator (uncredited)
 D.O.A. (1950) as Chester
 Where the Sidewalk Ends (1950) as Steve, Scalise Hood (uncredited)
 Kiss Tomorrow Goodbye (1950) as Carleton (uncredited)
 Halls of Montezuma (1951) as Sgt. Zelenko
 Only the Valiant (1951) as Sgt. Ben Murdock
 The Mob (1951) as Gunner
 Red Mountain (1951) as Lt. Dixon
 Flame of Araby (1951) as Kral
 Kansas City Confidential (1952) as Boyd Kane
 The Turning Point (1952) as Red
 Stalag 17 (1953) as Duke
 The Charge at Feather River (1953) as Pvt. Morgan
 The Man from the Alamo (1953) as Dawes
 Gun Fury (1953) as Brazos
 Man Crazy (1953) as Paul Wocynski
 Riot in Cell Block 11 (1954) as James V. Dunn
 Prince Valiant (1954) as Viking Warrior Chief (uncredited)
 The Lone Gun (1954) as Tray Moran
 Return from the Sea (1954) as CPO Chuck 'Soup Bowl' MacLish
 The Prodigal (1955) as Rhakim
 The Return of Jack Slade (1955) as Harry Sutton
 Bobby Ware Is Missing (1955) as Police Lt. Andy Flynn
 Fury at Gunsight Pass (1956) as Dirk Hogan
 Raw Edge (1956) as Tarp Penny
 Mohawk (1956) as Rokhawah
 The Three Outlaws (1956) as Butch Cassidy
 Gun Brothers (1956) as Jubal Santee
 Love Me Tender (1956) as Mike Gavin
 The Way to the Gold (1957) as Little Brother Williams
 The Lonely Man (1957) as King Fisher
 The Tin Star (1957) as Bart Bogardus
 Cry Terror! (1958) as Steve
 Badman's Country (1958) as Butch Cassidy
 Five Gates to Hell (1959) as Chen Pamok
 The Adventures of Huckleberry Finn (1960) as Pap Finn
 The Last Sunset (1961) as Frank Hobbs
 The George Raft Story (1961) as Al Capone
 Birdman of Alcatraz (1962) as Bull Ransom
 Hero's Island (1962) as Kingstree
 That Darn Cat! (1965) as Dan
 Three Guns for Texas (1968) as Texas Ranger Reese Bennett
 Backtrack (1969) as Texas Ranger Reese Bennett (archive footage)
 The Desperados (1969) as Marshal Kilpatrick
 Tora! Tora! Tora! (1970) as Lieutenant Kaminsky
 The Mad Bomber (1973) as George Fromley
 This Is a Hijack (1973) as Dominic
 Cahill U.S. Marshal (1973) as Lightfoot
 Scalawag (1973) as Brimstone / Mudhook
 The Deadly Trackers (1973) as Choo Choo
 Killdozer! (1974) (TV) as Chub Foster
 Psychic Killer (1975) as Lemonowski
 Death Stalk (1975) (TV) as Cal Shepherd
 Eaten Alive (1976) as Judd
 Fire! (1977) (TV) as Larry Durant
 The Mouse and His Child (1977) as Iggy (voice)
 Hi-Riders (1978) as Red
 The Seekers (1979) (TV) as Capt. Isaac Drew
 Five Days from Home (1979) as Inspector Markley
 Angels' Brigade (1979) as Miller
 The Ninth Configuration (1980) as Maj. Marvin Groper
 Without Warning (1980) as Leo
 The Return (1980) as Walt
 Evils of the Night (1985) as Kurt (filmed in 1983; final film role)

Television

Stage 7 – episode – "Armed" (1955) as Maj. Stevens
The Scarface Mob – television movie (1959) as Al Capone
The Untouchables – episode – Pilot (1959–1961) as Al Capone
Westinghouse Desilu Playhouse – episodes – "The Untouchables: Parts 1 & 2" (1959) as Al Capone
Bonanza (1960–1971, three episodes) as Gunnar Borgstrom / Pepper Shannon / Doyle
Rawhide – episode – "Incident of the Devil and His Due" (1960) as Gaff
Straightaway – episode – "The Tin Caesar" (1961) as Sheriff Bardeen
Death Valley Days – episode – "Preacher with a Past" (1962) as John Wesley Hardin
Ben Casey – episode – "Will Everyone Who Believes in Terry Dunne Please Applaud" (1963) as Terry Dunne 
The Lieutenant – episode – "The Two Star Giant" (1963) as General Stone
Rawhide – episode – "Incident of the Red Wind" (1963) as Lou Bowdark
Wagon Train (1964) as Zebedee Titus / Sheriff Frank Lewis aka Jed Whitmore
Destry – episode – "The Solid Gold Girl" (1964) as Johnny Washburn
The Twilight Zone – episode – "The Encounter" (1964) as Fenton
Combat! – episode – "Fly Away Home" (1964) as Sergeant Keeley
Gunsmoke – episode – "Kioga" (1965) as Jayce McCaw
The Virginian (1965–1970) as Sheriff Wintle / Reese Bennett
Laredo (1965–1967) as Reese Bennett
Daniel Boone – episode – "Tanner" (1967) as Tanner
Tarzan – episode – "Alex the Great" (1968) as Alex Spence
Alias Smith and Jones (1971–1972) as Chuck Gorman / Sam Bacon
Marcus Welby, M.D. – episode – "Don't Talk About Darkness" (1972) as Kenny Carpenter
Longstreet – episode – "Survival Times Two" (1972) as La Brien
McCloud (1972–1975) as Burl Connors / Det. Lt. Roy Mackie / Fred Schultke
The Magician – episode – "Lighting on a Dry Day" (1973) as Sheriff Platt
Kojak – episode – "Sweeter Than Life" (1975) as Sonny South
Police Story – episode – "War Games" (1975) as Norman Schoeler
Police Woman – episode – "The Loner" (1975) as Briscoe
Swiss Family Robinson – episode – "Jean LaFitte: Part 1" (1976) as Gambi
Captains and the Kings (1976) as O'Herlihy
Captains Courageous (1977) as Little Penn
The Eddie Capra Mysteries – episode – "Murder Plays a Dead Hand" (1979) as Frankie Dallas
Quincy, M.E. – episode – "Dark Angel" (1979) as Police Officer Tommy Bates
Fantasy Island – episode – "Nona/One Million B.C." (1980) as Lucus

Footnotes

References
 Hannsberry, Karen Burroughs.  Bad Boys: The Actors of Film Noir. Jefferson, North Carolina:  McFarland, 2003.
 Horner, William R. Bad at the Bijou.  Jefferson NC: McFarland, 1982.
 Wise, James E., Jr. and Paul W. Wilderson III. Stars in Khaki. Annapolis: Naval Institute Press, 2000.

External links

 
 
 
 
 Neville Brand: Setting the Record Straight by Robert E. Witter

1920 births
1992 deaths
20th-century American male actors
American male film actors
American male television actors
American shooting survivors
Burials in California
California Republicans
Deaths from emphysema
Illinois National Guard personnel
Illinois Republicans
Iowa Republicans
Male Western (genre) film actors
Male actors from Iowa
People from Cass County, Iowa
People from Kewanee, Illinois
Recipients of the Silver Star
United States Army personnel of World War II
United States Army soldiers
Western (genre) television actors